Heikki Hakola (11 December 1929 – 29 March 2016) was a Finnish wrestler. He competed in the men's Greco-Roman flyweight at the 1960 Summer Olympics.

References

External links
 

1929 births
2016 deaths
Finnish male sport wrestlers
Olympic wrestlers of Finland
Wrestlers at the 1960 Summer Olympics
People from Lapua
Sportspeople from South Ostrobothnia